Trichothyriella is a genus of fungi in the Microthyriaceae family. This is a monotypic genus, containing the single species Trichothyriella quercigena.

References

External links
Index Fungorum

Microthyriales
Monotypic Dothideomycetes genera